Massimo Sacchi (born 17 May 1950) is an Italian former swimmer. He competed in the men's 4 × 100 metre medley relay at the 1968 Summer Olympics.

References

1950 births
Living people
Italian male swimmers
Olympic swimmers of Italy
Swimmers at the 1968 Summer Olympics
Swimmers from Milan